Lord Mord is a Czech historical novel, written by Miloš Urban. It was first published in 2008.

References

2008 Czech novels